In knot theory, the cinquefoil knot, also known as Solomon's seal knot or the pentafoil knot, is one of two knots with crossing number five, the other being the three-twist knot.  It is listed as the 51 knot in the Alexander-Briggs notation, and can also be described as the (5,2)-torus knot.  The cinquefoil is the closed version of the double overhand knot.

Properties
The cinquefoil is a prime knot.  Its writhe is 5, and it is invertible but not amphichiral. Its Alexander polynomial is
,
its Conway polynomial is
,
and its Jones polynomial is

These are the same as the Alexander, Conway, and Jones polynomials of the knot 10132. However, the Kauffman polynomial can be used to distinguish between these two knots.

History
The name “cinquefoil” comes from the five-petaled flowers of plants in the genus Potentilla.

See also
 Pentagram
 Trefoil knot
 7₁ knot
 Skein relation

References

Further reading